The 1990–91 Chicago Blackhawks season was the team's 65th season.  After making the Conference Finals two years in a row, the Blackhawks were hosts for one of the most emotional NHL All-Star Game games in history, and finished with 106 points winning the NHL Presidents' Trophy for best record in the league. The Hawks received terrific performances from Steve Larmer, Jeremy Roenick, Chris Chelios, Dirk Graham and rookie Ed Belfour.  Hockey it seemed was back in Chicago, and dreams of the first Stanley Cup since 1961 were rampant.  However the playoffs matched the Hawks with their old rivals, the Minnesota North Stars, who defeated the Hawks in the first round of the 1991 Stanley Cup playoffs 4–2. The 1990-91 edition of the Blackhawks represented the peak of the team between the Bobby Hull/Stan Mikita era and the Jonathan Toews/Patrick Kane era, and is probably the greatest Blackhawks team of all time to never to win the Stanley Cup.

Offseason

Coach Mike Keenan assumed the role General Manager while remaining coach, and traded fan-favorite Denis Savard to the Montreal Canadiens for Chicago native Chris Chelios in the summer of 1990.  Several of the older Blackhawks (Al Secord, Bob Murray and Duane Sutter) retired.

NHL Draft

Regular season

The Blackhawks played at a high level all season as they won the Norris Division, the Western Conference regular season, and their first Presidents' Trophy for having the best record in the NHL with a record of 49–23–8 – good for 106 points. The Hawks edged St. Louis for all three titles as the Blues finished second with 105 points on the last day of the season with a win over the Red Wings. In addition to winning the Presidents' Trophy as the NHL's best team during the regular season, the Blackhawks also were the NHL's best defense, having allowed only 211 goals over 80 games. Despite being the most penalized team during the regular season, with 425 short-handed situations, the Blackhawks had a penalty-killing percentage of 84.00%, good enough for 2nd place in the league. The Blackhawks also led the NHL in short-handed goals scored, with 20.

On October 25, 1990, Steve Larmer scored just 8 seconds into the overtime period to give the Blackhawks a 3-2 home win over the Washington Capitals. It would prove to be the fastest overtime goal scored during the 1990-91 NHL regular season.

All-Star Game

The 42nd National Hockey League All-Star Game took place in Chicago Stadium, home of the Chicago Blackhawks, on January 19, 1991. The game saw the team of Campbell conference all-stars beat the team of Wales conference all-stars 11–5.

While the game was high-scoring and exciting, the real story was the emotions. First from a hockey perspective, Chicago had not hosted an All-Star Game since 1974, and the Blackhawks resurgence was fueled by three All-Stars – Steve Larmer, Jeremy Roenick (his first), and Chris Chelios, all of whom received great ovations from the hometown fans during introductions. The second, larger perspective was that the game was played during the war with Iraq, and Operation Desert Storm had just started two days earlier. Some players asked that the game be delayed, but the league pressed on and players wore decals on their helmets supporting the troops. When Wayne Messmer stepped to the microphone and the organ began to play the pre-game National Anthem, the roar from the Chicago Stadium crowd, many of whom waved flags and sparklers, was deafening and sustained over the length of the song, totally overwhelming the performance, and creating a patriotic moment of history that transcended the sport.

Season standings

Schedule and results

Player statistics

Regular season
Scoring

Goaltending

Playoffs
After reaching the Conference finals the prior two years and winning the Presidents' Trophy, hopes were extremely high entering the playoffs. The first round again reunited the Hawks with their old rivals from Minnesota who the Blackhawks needed seven games to dispatch in the prior year when the North Stars were the last place team in the division. This series however would not last seven games.  The teams needed overtime to determine the winner of Game 1 at the Chicago Stadium, however it was Minnesota who emerged as the 4–3 winner. The Blackhawks won Games 2 and 3, an easy 5–2 win in Chicago, and a close 6–5 win in Minnesota. However the North Stars swept the remaining games in blowout fashion including a 6–0 shutout on the Hawks home ice in Game 5. What was looking like it could be one of the greatest seasons in Hawks history was suddenly over. Minnesota won their next two series and reached the Stanley Cup Finals where they lost to Mario Lemieux and the Pittsburgh Penguins in six games.

Scoring

Goaltending

Note: Pos = Position; GP = Games played; G = Goals; A = Assists; Pts = Points; +/- = plus/minus; PIM = Penalty minutes; PPG = Power-play goals; SHG = Short-handed goals; GWG = Game-winning goals
      MIN = Minutes played; W = Wins; L = Losses; T = Ties; GA = Goals-against; GAA = Goals-against average; SO = Shutouts; SA = Shots against; SV = Shots saved; SV% = Save percentage;

Awards and records
 Presidents' Trophy:
 Calder Memorial Trophy: Ed Belfour
 Frank J. Selke Trophy: Dirk Graham
 Vezina Trophy: Ed Belfour
 William M. Jennings Trophy: Ed Belfour
 Ed Belfour, Goaltender, NHL All-Rookie Team
 Chris Chelios, Defence, NHL Second Team All-Star
 Jeremy Roenick, Center, NHL Second Team All-Star
 Steve Larmer, Right Wing, NHL Second Team All-Star

References
Blackhawks on Hockey Database

1990-91
1990-91
1990–91 NHL season by team
1990–91 in American ice hockey by team
1990-91
1990
1990 in sports in Illinois
1991 in sports in Illinois